Christopher Cvetko (born 2 April 1997) is an Austrian football player. He plays for Austrian Bundesliga club SK Austria Klagenfurt.

Club career
He made his Austrian Football First League debut for FC Blau-Weiß Linz on 10 March 2017 in a game against SC Austria Lustenau.

References

External links
 

1997 births
Sportspeople from Klagenfurt
Footballers from Carinthia (state)
Living people
Austrian footballers
Austria youth international footballers
Austrian expatriate footballers
Expatriate footballers in England
FC Blau-Weiß Linz players
FC Juniors OÖ players
LASK players
SK Austria Klagenfurt players
2. Liga (Austria) players
Austrian Football Bundesliga players
Association football midfielders
Austrian people of Slovenian descent